Legio V Macedonica (the Fifth Macedonian Legion) was a Roman legion. It was probably originally levied in 43 BC by consul Gaius Vibius Pansa Caetronianus and Gaius Iulius Caesar Octavianus (later known as the Emperor Augustus). It was based in the Balkan provinces of Macedonia, Moesia and Dacia. In the Notitia Dignitatum records from beginning of the fifth century, the legion was still stationed in Dacia, with detachments stationed in the east and Egypt.

The last known evidence shows the legion, or detachments from it, stationed in Egypt in the seventh century one or two years before the Islamic conquest of Egypt. It is often assumed that the legion fought in this war and was destroyed, although it is uncertain whether detachments or the whole legion were in Egypt, and there is no further evidence of the legion's eventual fate.

Its symbol was the bull, but the eagle was used as well.

History

1st century BC: Creation and deployment in Macedonia
The Legio V was one of the original twenty-eight legions raised by Octavian. There are two other fifth legions recorded: the V Gallica and the V Urbana. It is possible that these both were early names for the V Macedonica. The legion probably participated in the Battle of Actium (31 BC). It later moved to Macedonia, where it stayed from 30 BC to AD 6, gaining its cognomen, before moving to Oescus (Moesia).

1st century: First Jewish–Roman War

It took  part  in  the  suppression  of  rebellion among the Thracians south of the Balkan Range during the establishment of the new province of Moesia in AD 45.

In 62, some vexillationes of the Fifth fought under Lucius Caesennius Paetus in the Nero's Parthian War in Armenia. After the defeat of the Battle of Rhandeia, the whole V Macedonica, together with III Gallica, VI Ferrata, and X Fretensis under the command of Gnaeus Domitius Corbulo, was sent to the east to fight in the conclusion of the war.

The Fifth was probably still in the East when the First Jewish–Roman War in Iudaea Province began in 66. Nero gave the V Macedonica, the X Fretensis and the XV Apollinaris to Titus Flavius Vespasianus to counter the revolt. In 67, in Galilee, the city of Sepphoris surrendered peacefully to the Roman army, and later the V Macedonica conquered Mount Gerizim, the chief sanctuary of the Samaritans. In the Year of the Four Emperors, 68, the legion stayed inactive in Emmaus, where several tombstones of soldiers of the V Macedonica remain. After the proclamation of Vespasian as Emperor and the end of the war under his son Titus, the V Macedonica left Iudaea and returned to Oescus in 71. It took part in the first phase of Domitian's Dacian War in 85-86.

In 96 emperor Hadrian served the legion as an officer (tribunus militum).

2nd century: In Dacia and Near East
In 101, the legion moved to Dacia, to fight in Emperor Trajan's campaign against the king Decebalus. After the war ended in 106, the legion remained in Troesmis (modern Iglita), near the Danube Delta since 107. A centurion of the legion, Calventius Viator, rose to prominence and was eventually promoted to commander of the emperor's horse guards, the equites singulares Augusti.

Based on a Roman inscription discovered near Betar, Hadrian removed the V Macedonica from Dacia (present-day Romania) and sent it to Provincia Iudaea, or what is Judea, along with Legio XI Claudia, in order to put down an insurrection that broke out in the 16th year of his reign as Roman Emperor, while  Tineius (Tynius) Rufus  was governor of the province, and which later became known as the Jewish Revolt under Bar Kokhba.

When Emperor Lucius Verus started his campaign against the Parthians (161–166), the legion moved to the east, but was later returned in Dacia Porolissensis, with a basecamp in Potaissa.

The northern frontier was a hot border of the Empire; when emperor Marcus Aurelius had to fight against the Marcomanni, the Iazyges, and the Quadi, the V Macedonica was involved in these fights.

At the beginning of the reign of Commodus, the V Macedonica and the XIII Gemina once again defeated the Iazyges, under the later usurpers Pescennius Niger and Clodius Albinus. The Fifth later supported Septimius Severus, in his fight for the purple.

In 185 or 187, the legion was awarded of the title Pia Constans ("Faithful and reliable") or Pia Fidelis ("Faithful and loyal"), after defeating a mercenary army in Dacia.

Later centuries: Honors and evolution
While remaining at Potaissa for most of the 3rd century, V Macedonica fought several times, earning honors. Valerian gave the Fifth the name III Pia III Fidelis; his son, Gallienus gave the legion the title VII Pia VII Fidelis, with the 4th, 5th and 6th titles awarded probably when the legion was used as a mobile cavalry unit against usurpers Ingenuus and Regalianus (260, Moesia). A vexillatio fought against Victorinus (Gaul, 269–271).

The legion returned to Oescus in 274, after Aurelian had retired from Dacia. It guarded the province in later centuries, becoming a comitatensis unit under the Magister Militum per Orientis. It probably became part of the Byzantine army.

The cavalry unit created by Gallienus was definitively detached by Diocletian, and become part of his comitatus. This unit was sent to Mesopotamia, where it successfully fought against the Sassanid Empire in 296, and then to Memphis, where it remained until becoming part of the Byzantine army.

Legio V Macedonica is mentioned again in the Notitia Dignitatum, stationed in Dacia Ripensis, with detachments in the Oriental Field Army and in Egypt.

Legio V Macedonica is again mentioned in both Antaeapolis and Heliopolis in inscriptions, which seem to have been detachments of the units in Memphis. The last inscription provides the date of 635 or 636, indicating that at least part of the Legion was in Egypt until just before the conquest of Egypt by the Arabs began in 637. This would make Legio V Macedonica the longest-lived Roman Legion known to history, spanning 680 years from 43 BC to 637 AD; the entire history of the Roman Empire in the Classical Era.

Gallery

Attested members

See also 
 List of Roman legions

Bibliography 

 livius.org account
 E. Ritterling, "Legio", RE XII, col. 1572-5
 Rumen Ivanov, "Lixa Legionis V Macedonicae aus Oescus", Zeitschrift für Papyrologie und Epigraphik 80, 1990, p. 131-136
 D. Barag, S. Qedar, "A Countermark of the Legio Quinta Scytica from the Jewish War", INJ 13 (1994–1999), pp. 66–69.
 S. Gerson, "A New Countermark of the Fifth Legion", INR 1 (2006), pp. 97–100
 Dr. Gerson, "A Coin Countermarked by Two Roman Legions", Israel Numismatic Journal 16, 2007–08, pp. 100–102
 P. M. Séjourné, "Nouvelles de Jérusalem", RB 6, 1897, p. 131
 E. Michon, "Inscription d'Amwas", RB 7, 1898, p. 269–271
 J. H. Landau, "Two Inscribed Tombstones", Atiqot, vol. XI, Jerusalem, 1976

References 

05 Macedonica
40s BC establishments
1st-century BC establishments in the Roman Republic
Macedonia (Roman province)
05 Macedonica
Military units and formations established in the 1st century BC
First Jewish–Roman War